Clodovil Hernandes (17 June 1937 – 17 March 2009) was a Brazilian fashion designer, television presenter, and politician. 
Hernandes made his fame as a fashion stylist during the 60s and 70s, after which he was invited to work on television. His dedication and fame on television lasted for over 40 years and various television stations. In his political career, Hernandes was known for statements deemed inappropriate, often directed at other famous personalities. Among other controversies, he was accused of racism and antisemitism. Hernandes was the first openly gay congressman in Brazil.

Biography
Hernandes was born on Thursday, 17 June 1937, in Elisiário, and raised by a Spanish immigrant couple (Diego Hernández and Isabel Sánchez); he apparently never knew his biological parents. He had great affection for his adoptive mother, a Spanish immigrant from Andalusia. One of his projects in the Chamber of Deputies was to create the Dia da Mãe Adotiva  (Adoptive Mother's Day) that would be celebrated on the third Sunday of May. Hernandes was educated in a Catholic school; besides his native Portuguese, he could speak Spanish (his parents' language) and French.

Fashion stylist
Hernandes began his career as a stylist at age 16. In the 1960s he gained fame as a designer of haute couture.

Television
In the 1980s Hernandes became a TV personality with appearances on Rede Globo's "TV Mulher", one of the first Brazilian shows dedicated to the contemporary woman. His career as a TV presenter had its ups and downs throughout the 1990s.  Although he had a strong female following, his explicit right-wing position and unstable relations with co-workers led to frequent job losses.

After his breakthrough on TV Mulher, Clodovil was fired from the female-oriented programme hosted by Marília Gabriela and sexologist/current São Paulo Brazilian Secretary of Tourism, Marta Suplicy. In 1982, when Walter Clark, Globo's former director general, was invited to become a director on the Rede Bandeirantes network, Clodovil hosted his programme. In the 1993 TV season, Clodovil hosted a show in Rede Manchete, however the network, based in Rio de Janeiro, suffered a severe financial crisis and strike action as well as a suspension of part of its scheduled national broadcast. Adolpho Bloch regained control of the network by legal determination and Clodovil left the channel in the first days of May due to past differences with his ex-boss.

In 2006 in São Paulo, Clodovil was depicted in a musical. He defended the preservation of Mata Atlântica in the Ubatuba region and minority rights in the lower house. His future project was Casa Clô, a foundation attended by women not helped by official social assistance programmes.

Clodovil trained as an actor and as a singer. He designed the evening gowns for Miss Brasil and Miss Universe Sandra Mara Ferreira and Sandra Guimarães de Oliveira.

His controversial declarations on Rede TV!, caused legal consequences for Clodovil's artistic career. He was the presenter of Clodovil Por Excelência (Clodovil By Excellence) on the TVJB network, which was established in March 2007.

Views
In an interview with Rádio Tupi on Friday, 27 October 2006, Clodovil stated that Jews manipulated the Holocaust and forged the September 11 attacks. In the same interview, he referred to black people as "complex creoles." To defend his opinions, he told the radio that there is an "extinguished power, that is in the underground of things". According to Clodovil, "People are led to believe. When there was that incident with the Twin Towers there were no Americans and no Jews."

The president of the Israeli Federation of Rio, Osias Wurman, declared himself outraged with the declarations, mainly because they came from a person coming from a minority that also undergoes prejudice. Wurman filed a court action against Clodovil, accusing him of being a racist, as well as sending copies of the audio interview to the State Department of Human Rights, state deputies and nongovernmental organizations linked to the black movement.

Congressman

In the 2006 elections, Clodovil Hernandes was elected federal congressman for the state of São Paulo, being the third most voted congressman in his state, with 493,951 votes or 2.43% of the valid vote. He was a candidate for the Christian Labour Party. His political phrase was: "Brasília will never be the same". Clodovil favored legislation that banned toys resembling tobacco products, restricted violent images in television newscasts during family hours and reduced the number of congresspersons in the Brazilian parliament.

Death
Clodovil Hernandes died in Brasília at 6:50 PM (21:50 GMT) on Tuesday, 17 March 2009, after a stroke.

Television career
TV Mulher (Rede Globo, 1980 season)
Clô para os Íntimos (Rede Manchete, 1987-1988 seasons)
Noite de Gala (CNT, 1993–1995)
Clô Soft (Rede Bandeirantes, 1996–1997)
A Casa é Sua (Rede TV!, 2004–2005)
Clodovil Por Excelência (Rede JB, soon on April season)

Political phrases
2006 campaign"Brasília will never be the same"."I will not promise anything. I will report [any kind of corruption] that comes directly to me".

Theatral careerElas por Elas'' (2006)

Notes

References

External links

Clodovil Hernandez's site on Brazilian portal UOL

Brazilian fashion designers
Brazilian television presenters
Gay politicians
Gay entertainers
LGBT Christians
LGBT fashion designers
Brazilian LGBT politicians
1937 births
2009 deaths
Members of the Chamber of Deputies (Brazil) from São Paulo
Christian Labour Party politicians
Liberal Party (Brazil, 2006) politicians
Brazilian LGBT broadcasters
Fashion stylists
9/11 conspiracy theorists
Holocaust deniers
Brazilian people of Spanish descent
LGBT legislators
LGBT conservatism
Brazilian LGBT entertainers
20th-century Brazilian LGBT people
21st-century Brazilian LGBT people
Television controversies in Brazil